The Perhentian Islands (Malay: Kepulauan Perhentian) are islands in Besut District, Terengganu, Malaysia.

The two main islands are Perhentian Besar ("Greater Perhentian") and Perhentian Kecil ("Lesser Perhentian").  The small, uninhabited islands of Susu Dara (Virgin Milk), Serengeh and Rawa, lie off Kecil. Like Besut, people generally speak Kelantanese Malay. However, English is also widely spoken.

History
The name "Perhentian" means "stopping point" in Malay, referring to the islands' traditional role as a waypoint for traders between Bangkok and Malaysia. The islands were sparsely inhabited by fishers for centuries, although tourism now accounts for most of the economic activity.

The Perhentian Islands appear on many maps from the nineteenth and twentieth century as 'The Station Islands'. This arises from the British colonial period, as an English translation of "stopping point".

Pulau Perhentian was one of the islands where Vietnamese refugees or boat people landed during the 1970s.

The islands were gazetted as a marine park in 1994, prohibiting all fishing within two miles from the shore.

Geography

Two main islands

Nature tourism provides the economic base for the islands. Both the islands have white coral sand beaches and a clear sea. Popular tourist activities include scuba-diving, snorkeling, and swimming.   The islands are home to numerous different species of monitor lizards, venomous spiders, and geckos. In the water and on the coral reefs, sea turtles, clownfish, cuttlefish, blue spotted rays, and black tipped sharks swim freely among many others.

The Perhentian islands have a tropical climate with temperatures steadily around 30 °C (86 degrees F) and frequent, brief thunderstorms.  During peak season, the waters are calm, making conditions favourable for diving.  There are dozens of dive sites around both main islands, as well as several off-shore sites.

Five uninhabited islands
There are five more islands in the Perhentian archipelago other than Perhentian Besar and Perhentian Kecil. These five islands are uninhabited, but are sometimes used as snorkeling and scuba diving sites. Three of the islands, Rawa, Serengeh and Tokong Burung, are accessible by boat.

Transportation
The Perhentian Islands do not have any paved roads or air strips.  Transportation to, from and between the islands is primarily on speed boats from the jetty at Kuala Besut on the Malaysian mainland.  Jungle trails connect the individual beaches on both islands.

Climate
The Perhentian islands experience a heavy monsoon season between November and February, and most of the islands are essentially closed off to tourists. Resorts and ferry services are stopped during this time due to the weather but there is still a boat service daily to serve the fishermen village at Pulau Perhentian Kecil. On average each year, the Perhentian Islands receive over 98.3 plus inches of rain and experience roughly 12 daylight hours.

Utilities
Utilities on the island have not kept pace with the rapid expansion in tourism.  In the summer of 2007, two wind turbines were installed, although they were still not connected to the network as of August 2013, leaving diesel generators as the main source of the islands' electrical power.  The islands have mobile phone coverage, but as of 2022 still lack a sewerage system, leading some resorts to discharge wastewater directly into the sea.

Turtle conservation
The Perhentian Islands are home to a significant green and hawksbill sea turtle nesting population.  The Department of Fisheries runs a turtle hatchery on the islands to help address the declining turtle populations. Egg poaching from the beaches is a continuing problem.

See also

 Geography of Malaysia

References

External links

Tourism Malaysia - Pulau Perhentian

Islands of Terengganu
Archipelagoes of the Pacific Ocean
Marine reserves
Tourist attractions in Terengganu
Islands of Malaysia